The fourth series of Ex on the Beach, a British television programme, began airing on 19 January 2016 on MTV. The series concluded on 8 March 2016 after eight episodes. The group of cast members for this series include Geordie Shore star Scotty T, and Judge Geordie guest Lewis Good. Star of Magaluf Weekender Jordan Davies also made his return to the series having appeared during the third series, as well as Megan McKenna from the previous series. The series was filmed in Portugal. 

Whilst this series was airing, both Scotty T and Megan were both appearing in the seventeenth series or Celebrity Big Brother. Scotty T later went on to win the series. Olivia Walsh later returned to the fifth "all star" series, along with Jordan who returned to make his third appearance on the show. In 2017, Kieran Lee took part in the eighteenth series of Big Brother, but was evicted during the final week. Jordan Davies also took part in the twentieth series of Celebrity Big Brother in August 2017.

Cast
The official list of cast members were released on 15 December 2015. They include four boys; Joe Delaney, Lewis Good, Scotty T and Youssef Hassane, and four girls; Helen Briggs, Nancy-May Turner, Naomi Hedman and Olivia Walsh. With the announcement of the line-up it was also confirmed that Megan McKenna and Jordan Davies would be making their return to the series as exes. Both previously appeared during Series 3 of the show, whilst Jordan was known for appearing on Magaluf Weekender. Scotty T, star of Geordie Shore was named amongst the cast members, as well as Lewis Good, who is known for appearing on Judge Geordie.

All original cast members arrived at the beach during the first episode and were immediately told to prepare for the arrival of their exes. Olivia's ex-boyfriend James Moore made his debut appearance during the first episode to stir up trouble in the villa, then Kieran Lee, the ex-boyfriend of Helen Briggs arrived looking for love. During the second episode, the group were shocked to discover that the exes could arrive anywhere, not just at the beach, as Gina Barrett arrived wanting to rekindle her romance with her ex-boyfriend Joe. Ashleigh Defty also turned up on the beach as an ex of Scotty T's. The third episode saw the debut of Youssef's one night stand Lacey Fuller, and the Tablet of Terror delivered another shock when Nancy-May was forced to ask one of her housemates to leave the villa. She chose Youssef. Jordan Davies arrived during the fourth episode as an ex one night stand of Lacey, however he was joined by his girlfriend Megan McKenna. Following a violent confrontation with Jordan, Lewis was removed from the villa and did not return. During the fifth episode, Helen's second ex Chet Johnson arrived on the beach, and both instantly rekindled their relationship. James Moore's ex, Kristina Metcalf debuted in the sixth episode arriving during his date with Ashleigh looking to stir things up. The seventh episode featured Gina's next ex, Alex Kippen who arrived to instantly cause trouble. The Tablet of Terror then sprung a surprise on Gina, ordering her to send one of her exes home; Alex or Joe. She chose Joe. Kristina also decided to leave the villa during this episode after feeling isolated. The final ex of the series, Brandon Myers arrived during the eighth episode as Lacey's ex-boyfriend.

Bold indicates original cast member; all other cast were brought into the series as an ex.

Duration of cast

Table Key
 Key:  = "Cast member" is featured in this episode
 Key:  = "Cast member" arrives on the beach
 Key:  = "Cast member" has an ex arrive on the beach
 Key:  = "Cast member" arrives on the beach and has an ex arrive during the same episode
 Key:  = "Cast member" leaves the beach
 Key:  = "Cast member" has an ex arrive on the beach and leaves during the same episode
 Key:  = "Cast member" does not feature in this episode

Episodes

{| class="wikitable plainrowheaders" style="width:100%"
|- style="color:black"
! style="background:#81F781;"| No. inseries
! style="background:#81F781;"| No. inseason
! style="background:#81F781;"| Title
! style="background:#81F781;"| Original air date
! style="background:#81F781;"| Duration
! style="background:#81F781;"| UK viewers

|}

Ratings

References

External links
Official website

2016 British television seasons
04